Reljinac is a village in the municipality of Prokuplje, Serbia. According to the 2002 census, the village has a population of 611 people.

References

Populated places in Toplica District
Populated places in Serbia